The 2021–22 Primera División de El Salvador, also known as the Liga Pepsi, is the 23rd season and 45th and 46th Primera División tournament, El Salvador's top football division, since its establishment of an Apertura and Clausura format. Alianza F.C. and C.D. FAS are the defending champions of both Apertura and Clausura tournaments respectively. The league will consist of 12 teams. There will be two seasons conducted under identical rules, with each team playing a home and away game against the other clubs for a total of 22 games per tournament. At the end of each half-season tournament, the top six teams in that tournament's regular season standings will take part in the playoffs.

The champions of Apertura or Clausura with the better aggregate record will qualify for the 2023 CONCACAF Champions League. The other champion, and the runner-up with the better aggregate record will qualify for the 2022 CONCACAF League. Should the same team win both tournaments, both runners-up will qualify for CONCACAF League. Should the final of both tournaments features the same two teams, the semi-finalist with the better aggregate record will qualify for CONCACAF League.

Teams

Promotion and relegation 

A total of 12 teams will contest the league, including 11 sides from the 2020–21 Primera División and 1 promoted from the 2020–21 Segunda División.

C.D. Platense Municipal Zacatecoluca was promoted to the Primera División in June 2021 after defeating Real Destroyer in a playoff match by a score of 2–1.

C.D. Sonsonate was relegated to the 2021–22 Segunda División.

Stadiums and locations

Notable events

Notable death from Clausura 2021 season and 2022 Apertura season 
The following people associated with the Primera Division have died between the middle of 2021 and middle of 2022.

 Zizinho (Brazilian, ex FAS player)
 Oscar Montes (ex ADET player)
 Luis Angel Leon (ex ADET coach)
 Raul “Cayito“ Mejia (ex Santa Anita, Atlante and Atlético Marte player)
 Edgar 'Pata Gorda' Morales (ex Alianza and Atlético Marte player)
 Conrado Miranda (ex Aguila, Atletico Marte player and Aguila, Atletico Marte, Queisqepue, Cojutepeque, Tiburones, Alianza coach)
 Hector Cedros (Uruguayan, ex FAS player)
 Hector Edmundo Valdiviseo (ex ADET, CESSA, Cojutepeque and Firpo player)
 Julio Cesar Oliva (ex Aguila player)
 Henrique Pasaquiri (Brazilian, ex FAS player)
 Ramon Zumbado (ex Atletico Marte player)
 Nahún Corro Bazan (Mexican, Ex Aguila player)

Managerial changes

Before the start of the season

During the Apertura season

Between the Apertura and Clausura season

Clausura seasons

Apertura 2021

League table

Apertura 2021 Results 

|-
| 31 July – 18:00 || Chalatenango ||style="background:#FEFBBB;"| 2–2 || Platense || Report
|-
| 31 July – 19:00 || Isidro Metapán ||style="background:#FEFBBB;"| 0–0 || Atlético Marte || Report
|-
| 1 August – 15:00 || Once Municipal ||style="background:#FEFBBB;"| 2–2 || Águila || Report
|-
| 1 August – 15:00 || Luis Ángel Firpo ||style="background:#FEFBBB;"| 1–1 || Jocoro || Report
|-
| 1 August – 15:15 ||style="background:#CFDBEB;"| FAS || 3–1 || Santa Tecla || Report
|-
| 1 August – 15:15 ||style="background:#CFDBEB;"| Alianza || 4–1 || Municipal Limeño || Report

|-
| 7 August – 18:00 || Atlético Marte || 0–2 ||style="background:#CFDBEB;"| Chalatenango || Report
|-
| 7 August – 18:00 ||style="background:#CFDBEB;"| Santa Tecla || 3–0 || Isidro Metapán || Report
|-
| 7 August – 19:00 || FAS ||style="background:#FEFBBB;"| 1–1 || Águila || Report
|-
| 7 August – 19:00 || Jocoro || 3–4 ||style="background:#CFDBEB;"| Once Municipal || Report
|-
| 8 August – 15:15 || Municipal Limeño ||style="background:#FEFBBB;"| 1–1 || Luis Ángel Firpo || Report
|-
| 8 August – 15:15 || Platense ||style="background:#FEFBBB;"| 2–2 || Alianza || Report

|-
| 4 August – 15:30 ||style="background:#CFDBEB;"| FAS || 4–1 || Santa Tecla || Report
|-
| 10 August – 15:00 || Atlético Marte || 0–1 ||style="background:#CFDBEB;"| Jocoro || Report
|-
| 11 August – 15:30 ||style="background:#CFDBEB;"| Luis Ángel Firpo || 3–2 || Platense || Report
|-
| 11 August – 18:00 ||style="background:#CFDBEB;"| Chalatenango || 2–1 || Alianza || Report
|-
| 11 August – 19:00 || Isidro Metapán ||style="background:#FEFBBB;"| 2–2 || Águila || Report
|-
| 12 August – 15:30 ||style="background:#CFDBEB;"| Once Municipal || 4–1 || Municipal Limeño || Report

Playoffs

Quarterfinals

First legs

Second legs

Chalatenango won 4-2 on penalties, after drawing 1-1 on aggregate 

Alianza FC won 4-2 on Aggregate

 Once Deportivo won 4-3 on penalties, after tying 1-1 aggregate

Platense won 4-3 on aggregate

Semifinals

First legs

Second legs

Alianza won 3-1 on aggregare

Platense won 2-1 on aggregate

Final

Apertura 2021 Records

Records 
 Best home records: Alianza F.C. (31 points out of 33 points)
 Worst home records: Limeno (8 points out of 33 points)
 Best away records : Once Deportivo (21 points out of 33 points)
 Worst away records : Isidro Metapan  (3 points out of 33 points)
 Most goals scored: Alianza F.C. (48 goals)
 Fewest goals scored: Isidro Metapan  Limeno (16 goals)
 Fewest goals conceded : Alianza F.C. (19 goals)
 Most goals conceded : Limeno (38 goals)

Scoring 
 First goal of the season:  Miguel Lemus for Chalatenango against Platense, 16 minutes ( 2021)
 First goal by a foreign player:  Camilo Delgado for Platense against Chalatenango, 23rd minutes ( 2021)
 Fastest goal in a match: 15 Seconds
  TBD for Limeno against FAS 2021)
 Goal scored at the latest goal in a match: 90+2 minutes
  Nicolas Martinez  goal for Aguila against Once Deportivo, (2021)
 First penalty Kick of the season:  Camilo Delgado for Platense against Chalatenango, 23rd minutes ( 2021)
 Widest winning margin: 3 goals
 Alianza F.C.  4-1 Limeno (October 18, 2021)
 First hat-trick of the season:  Duvier Riascos for  Alianza F.C. against Limeno  ( 2021)
 First own goal of the season:  Alexander Mendoza (Santa Tecla F.C.) for Alianza F.C. (October 11, 2020)
 Most goals in a match: 8 goals
 TBD 3-5 TBD (2021)
 Most goals by one team in a match: 4 goals
 Alianza F.C.  4-1 Limeno (October 18, 2021)
 Most goals in one half by one team: 3 goals
 TBD 2-3 (2-3) TBD (2nd half, December 20, 2021) 
 Most goals scored by losing team: 3 goals
 TBD 3-5 TBD (2021)
 Most goals by one player in a single match: 3 goals
 Duvier Riascos for  Alianza against Limeno  ( 2021)
 Players that scored a hat-trick': 
 Duvier Riascos for  Alianza against Limeno  ( 2021)
 Duvier Riascos for  Alianza against Jocoro  (September ,2021)
 Kenroy Howell for  C.D. Chalatenango against Isidro Metapan  (September ,2021)
 Rodolfo Zelaya for  Alianza against Santa Tecla  (november  17, 2021)

Clausura 2022

League table

Clausura 2022 Results

Playoffs

Quarterfinals

First legs

Second legs

Isidro Metapan won 3-1 on aggregate 

Alianza FC won 4-2 on Aggregate

Aguila won 3-2 on Aggregate

Platense won 3-1 on aggregate

Semifinals

First legs

Second legs

Alianza won 3-2 on aggregare

Águila won 4-2 on aggregate

Final

Clausura 2022 Records

Records 
 Best home records: Alianza F.C.  Jocoro  Chalatenango (22 points out of 33 points)
 Worst home records: Atletico Marte (12 points out of 33 points)
 Best away records : Aguila (21 points out of 33 points)
 Worst away records : Santa Tecla F.C.  (5 points out of 33 points)
 Most goals scored: Aguila (36 goals)
 Fewest goals scored: Once Deportivo de Ahuachapan  (16 goals)
 Fewest goals conceded :Aguila (15 goals)
 Most goals conceded : Jocoro (33 goals)

Scoring 
 First goal of the season:  Henry Castillo for Firpo against Limeno, 9 minutes (January 15, 2022)
 First goal by a foreign player:  Henry Castillo for Firpo against Limeno, 9 minutes (January 15, 2022)
 Fastest goal in a match: 2 Minutes
   Jair Crisanto for Jocoro against Alianza, (January 22, 2022)
 Goal scored at the latest goal in a match: 94 minutes
  Nelson Alvarenga goal for Jocoro against FAS, (January 26, 2022)
 First penalty Kick of the season:  Fabricio Alfaro for Aguila against FAS, 81st minutes (January 23, 2022)
 Widest winning margin: 3 goals
 Aguila 4-1 Jocoro (January 26, 2022)
 FAS 3-0 Atletico Marte (February 13, 2022)
 First hat-trick of the season:  Carlos Salazar for C.D. Chalatenango against Jocoro  (April 23, 2022)
 First own goal of the season:  Kevin Galdamez (Jocoro) for Isidro Metapan (February 13, 2022)
 Most goals in a match: 11 goals
 Jocoro F.C. 6-5 C.D. Chalatenango (April 23, 2022)
 Most goals by one team in a match: 4 goals
 Aguila   4-1 Jocoro (January 26, 2022)
 Most goals in one half by one team: 4 goals
 Jocoro 4-3 (6-5) C.D. Chalatenango (2nd half, April 23, 2022) 
 Most goals scored by losing team: 5 goals
 C.D. Chalatenango 5-6 Jocoro F.C. (April 23, 2022)
 Most goals by one player in a single match: 3 goals
 Carlos Salazar for C.D. Chalatenango against Jocoro  (April 23, 2022)
 Players that scored a hat-trick': 
 Carlos Salazar for C.D. Chalatenango against Jocoro  (April 23, 2022)
 Franco Arizala for Alianza against Limeno (April 23, 2022)

Aggregate table 
The Aggregate table is the general ranking for the 2021–22 season. This table is a sum of the Apertura 2021 and Clausura 2022 tournament standings. The aggregate table is used to determine seeding for the CONCACAF Tournaments and relegation to the segunda division

List of foreign players in the league 
This is a list of foreign players in the 2021–22 season. The following players:

 Have played at least one game for the respective club.
 Have not been capped for the El Salvador national football team on any level, independently from the birthplace

A new rule was introduced this season, that clubs can have four foreign players per club and can only add a new player if there is an injury or a player is released and it is before the close of the season transfer window. 

Águila
  Yan Maciel
  Luiz Carlos Caetano de Azevedo Júnior
  Lucas Ventura  
  Nicolas Martinez  
  Elison Rivas  
  Edgar Medrano 
  Fáider Fabio Burbano

Alianza
  Mitchel Mercado 
  Victor Arboleda  
  Duvier Riascos  
  Stiver Mena  
  Franco Arizala

Atletico Marte
  Andres Quejada
  Ricardinho   
  Joaquin Verges  
  Yoan Ballesteros   
  Luis Cuesta Col
  Eduardo Rodriguez 
  Tardelius Pena

Chalatenango
  Kemal Orlando Malcolm  
  Kenroy Howell   
  Yosel Piedra   
  Bladimir Diaz   
  Carlos Salazar
  Hector Renteria
  Dieter Vargas

FAS
  Luis Peralta  
  Roberto Chen 
  Clayvin Zuniga
  Mateo Ahmed  
  Jeferson Collazos
  Bladimir Diaz

Firpo
  Tardelius Pena  
  Jomal Williams 
  Wesley Tanque Da Silva  
  Darryl Parker
  Henry Castillo
  Gabriel Ventura

Isidro Metapán
  Gregori Diaz 
  Manuel Dimas Suarez 
  Juan Ramón García Martínez 
  Luis Copete 
  Edenilson Paulino Castillo  
  Joao Do Rosario  
  Jhoaho Hinestroza 
  Yerson Gutierrez Cuenca
  Luca Orozco

Jocoro
  Junior Padilla
  John Machado
  Diego Areco  
  Jose Luis Rodriguez  
  Jairy Crisanto 
  Nissi Sauceda 
  Yohalin Palacios

Limeño
  Felipe Ponce  
  William Palacio  
  Yosimar Quinones
  Manual Murillo  
  Sandro Melgarejo 
  Javier Lescano
  Yair Arboleda

Once Deportivo
  Edgar Medrano  
  Dieter Vargas  
  Craig Foster  
  José Miguel Barreto
  Juan Ignaio Mare
  Kamoy Kadeem Simpson
  Jabari Hylton

Platense
  Camilo Delgado
  Wilber Arizala
  Victor Labndazuri
  Javier Lescano  

Santa Tecla
  Alejandro Dautt  
  Cristian Olivera   
  Eduardo Rodriguez  
  Fabricio Silva  
  Elio Castro
  Jahir Barraza

 (player released during the Apertura season)
 (player released between the Apertura and Clausura seasons)
 (player released during the Clausura season)
 (player naturalized for the Clausura season)

References

External links 

 Calendario Nuevo Liga El Salvador Apertura

Primera División de Fútbol Profesional seasons
El Salvador
1
Football in El Salvador